Hillcrest is a suburb in the City of Logan, Queensland, Australia.

Geography
Hillcrest lies to the west of Browns Plains. It is bounded by Johnson Road, Mount Lindesay Highway, the interstate railway and Coronation Road to the south.

As the name suggests, part of the suburb is on the crest of a hill. The Wineglass Water Tower (named for its shape) on the top of the hill is visible for many kilometres; it is illuminated at night. The water tower holds 1M litres of water and weighs 400 tonnes.

History
The wineglass water tower was completed in June 1984.

Hillcrest was originally part of Browns Plains and was gazetted as a separate place name in June 1987.

The median age of the Hillcrest population was 31 years, 6 years below the national median of 37.  68.6% of people living in Hillcrest were born in Australia. The other top responses for country of birth were New Zealand 9.1%, England 3.7%, Philippines 1.5%, Fiji 0.9%, South Africa 0.7%.  82.9% of people spoke only English at home; the next most common languages were 1.2% Samoan, 0.9% Hindi, 0.9% Vietnamese, 0.9% Spanish, 0.7% Mandarin.

Facilities 

The Park Ridge Ambulance Station was officially opened in May 1982 and was located under the wineglass water tower. It employed three officers and had two ambulance vehicles. The Calam Lions Club donated an ambulance vehicle to the service. A temporary fire station was also located here between 1983 and 1986 when a permanent station known as Logan West was built in Orr Court.

The Browns Plains police station was built in 1988 at Orr Court. It was a twenty-four-hour station with twelve officers and five detectives at that time. A shop front police office was opened in Grand Plaza in August 2000 and, in June 2002, a $750,000 refurbishment of the police station included the provision of a Juvenile Aid Bureau, a secure holding cell, electronic interview room and finger printing facilities.

Amenities 
The Logan West Community Centre is located at 2 Wineglass Drive and has a hall with a capacity of 410 people (conference style) and 300 people (banquet style).  It began with the relocation of a house from Jacaranda Avenue Woodridge in October 1982. The house had been used as the headquarters of the Logan and Albert Library Board and then the Burragah Aboriginal Centre. A new community centre was built in 1988. The rotunda and water gardens are suitable for weddings and photography sessions.

Brisbane Taiwanese Uniting Church is at 1 Wineglass Drive. It is part of the Moreton Rivers Presbytery of the Uniting Church in Australia.

References

External links

 

Suburbs of Logan City
1987 establishments in Australia
Populated places established in 1987